CCTS may refer to:
 Camden County Technical Schools (United States, Gloucester or Pennsauken)
 Cooperation Council of Turkic-Speaking States (Eurasia)
 Commission for Complaints for Telecom-television Services (Canada, nationwide)
 Crow Creek Tribal School (South Dakota, United States)